Bedford Corners is a hamlet in the Westchester County town of Bedford, New York, United States, northeast of the town of Mount Kisco, with which it shares a post-office and zip code.
The area is very hilly with rocky terrain and substantial native hardwood deciduous trees.

Community 

The area is nearly 100% residential homes with a concentration of commercial activity along South Bedford Road (State Route 117) along the Mt. Kisco border and North Bedford Road.

Stonecrest, a historic Stick-Eastlake style home, was added to the National Register of Historic Places in 2004.

References 

Hamlets in New York (state)
Hamlets in Westchester County, New York